Deeper! is a 2020 Russian sex comedy film written and directed by Mikhail Segal.
The film tells about a young director who forced all the figures in the porn industry to play by his own rules, the film stars Aleksandr Pal, Lyubov Aksyonova, and Oleg Gaas.

It was theatrically released in Russia on October 22, 2020, by Sony Pictures Productions and Releasing (SPPR).

Plot 
The young theater director Roman Petrovich, due to his exactingness to the depth of the study of roles, misses the deadlines for the release of an important performance at the Main Theater of the Country and finds himself without a job. To earn a living, he takes on any job and one day replaces his friend at a part-time job: the director of a porn video.

Roman Petrovich approaches his work very responsibly, makes porn actors Lera and Timur really play, the filmed video is a resounding success and brings the director a permanent contract with an underground porn studio. New porn videos with Lera and Timur, directed by Roman Petrovich, open up the genre of "deep Russian porn" to the world and bring multimillion-dollar income to the owner of the porn studio, and Roman Petrovich himself - world fame and laurels as a pioneer of the new genre. 

The success of the young director is noticed by the President of the Country and invites him to fix things on the Main TV Channel of the Country, where the unlucky TV presenter Vladimir is rapidly losing the trust of viewers. Roman Petrovich, with the help of a deep study of the role, restores Vladimir's self-confidence, the trust of the audience and the rating. Success with Vladimir allows the Minister of Culture of the Country, with the consent of the President, to appoint Roman Petrovich as the artistic director of the Main Theater of the Country instead of the unsuccessful retrograde that once fired Roman Petrovich. Roman leaves the porn studio with regret and says goodbye to his troupe.

Carte blanche from the leadership of the Country and experience in porn allow Roman Petrovich to rethink the activities of the Main Theater of the Country as the highest form of the porn industry and put on a play, the premiere of which is attended by the President and heads of foreign states. Instead of the titled actors, Lera and Timur appear on the stage at the end of the performance and break the applause of the audience with their performance.

Cast 
 Aleksandr Pal as Roman Petrovich, a director
 Lyubov Aksyonova as Lera, a student, and a pornographic actress
 Oleg Gaas as Timur, a pornographic actor
 Ekaterina Sokolova as Ira, actress of the Main Theater, Roman's lover
 Igor Ugolnikov as Russian President
 Igor Vernik as cultural adviser / minister of culture
 Semyon Treskunov as Pasha, a porn business owner
 Denis Vasilyev as Andrey, a director, Roman's friend
 Sergey Burunov as Vladimir, TV presenter of the Main TV channel
 Anton Lapenko as Khachatryan, fashion director
 Vladimir Simonov as stage actor
 Vladimir Steklov as theatre artistic director

Production 
The film received neutral and favorable reviews from Russian-speaking critics. The reviewers noted the excellent acting work of Aleksandr Pal, who plays the main role and essentially holds the entire film. Some critics positively assessed the exact parodic images of both types and personalities of the modern Russian theatrical, television and film industry, while noting that the director nowhere crosses the border of benevolent irony.

Despite the provocative plot, the film received a 16+ rating, and the director himself said about the exclusion of explicit scenes: "This is the trick of our film: the story of the adventures of a porn film crew can be watched by the whole family, and no one will have to blush or turn pale."

Principal photography tapes were held in Moscow, Yaroslavl and Saint Petersburg.

Release 
Deeper! was theatrically released in the Russian Federation on October 22, 2020, by Sony Pictures Productions and Releasing (SPPR).

References

External links 
 

2020 films
2020s Russian-language films
2020s sex comedy films
Films about pornography
Russian sex comedy films
Russian comedy-drama films
2020 comedy-drama films